As Aventuras de Gregório is a 1920 Brazilian comedy film directed by Luiz de Barros.

Cast
Manuel F. Araujo
Ernesto Begonha
Yole Burlini
Alvaro Fonseca

External links
 

1920 comedy films
1920 films
Brazilian black-and-white films
Brazilian silent films
Films directed by Luiz de Barros
Brazilian comedy films